Tha Chang is a subdistrict in the Phrom Phiram District of Phitsanulok Province, Thailand.

Geography
Tha Chang lies in the Nan Basin, which is part of the Chao Phraya Watershed.

Administration
The following is a list of the subdistrict's muban, which roughly correspond to villages:

Radio
There is one radio station broadcast from Tambon Tha Chang, Siang Jaak Thahaan Reua (Sor. Thor. Ror. 8, Voice of the Navy).  The frequency is 1170 AM.

Notes

References

Tambon of Phitsanulok province
Populated places in Phitsanulok province